Invasion from 2500 is a science fiction novel by American writers Ted White and Terry Carr in 1964 under the pseudonym Norman Edwards. It was published by Monarch Books in August 1964.

Notes

External links
 
American science fiction novels
1964 American novels
Novels about time travel